Providence High School is a public high school located off of Pineville-Matthews Road in Charlotte, North Carolina, in suburban South Charlotte. Providence serves southern and southeastern Mecklenburg County and is a part of the Charlotte-Mecklenburg School District.

Its boundary includes a portion of Matthews.

Amenities 
 Main building
 Technical building
 Greenhouse
 Gym
 Swimming pool
 Football stadium
 Baseball stadium
 Practice fields
 Tennis courts
 Softball field
 Outdoor track facilities

AP classes  
 English Language and Composition
 English Literature and Composition
 Calculus AB and BC
 Statistics
 Biology II
 Chemistry II
 Economics (Micro & Macro)
 Environmental Science
 Computer Science Principles
 Computer Science A
 French Language V
 German V
 Latin V
 Spanish Language V
 Chinese
 Studio Art 2D and 3D
 Music Theory
 Art History
 Human Geography
 Psychology
 United States Comparative Government
 United States History
 United States Government/Politics
 Comparative Government/Politics
 World History
 European History
 Capstone (Seminar and Research)

Awards 
 1992, 1993, 1997, 2004: North Carolina Wachovia Cup for best overall athletic program in North Carolina
 1996:  Blue Ribbon "School of Excellence" 
 2002–03, 2003–04, 2004–05: North Carolina "School of Distinction" 
 2007–08, 2008–09, 2009–10: North Carolina "Honor School of Excellence"

Athletics 
Providence High School is affiliated with the North Carolina High School Athletic Association (NCHSAA) and is classified as a 4A school. Its mascot is the panther, and its colors are black and gold.

In 2001, the Providence Panthers women’s soccer team won the State of North Carolina 4A Championship game against Broughton with a win of 2-1.

In 2007, the Providence Panthers men's tennis team won the State of North Carolina 4A Dual Team Championships, and posted a perfect 17–0 season.

In 2015, the Providence Panthers men's varsity baseball team won the State 4A Championship game against Millbrook with a win of 10–2.

In 2016, the Providence Panthers women's varsity soccer team won the State of North Carolina 4A Championship game 2–1 against Apex Middle Creek.

In 2022, the Providence Panther men's varsity baseball team went undefeated and won the State 4A Championship.

Notable alumni 
 Ty Buttrey, MLB pitcher
 Brian Edwards, former professional soccer goalkeeper
 Ashley Fliehr, professional wrestler; multi-time WWE Women's Champion under the ring name Charlotte Flair; daughter of Ric Flair
 Reid Fliehr, former professional wrestler, son of Ric Flair
 Mark Freiburger, American filmmaker
 Antawn Jamison, UNC basketball alumnus, 2x NBA All-Star in 2005 and 2008
 Austin Proehl, NFL wide receiver
 Kevin Shackelford, MLB pitcher
 Richie Shaffer, first round draft pick in the 2012 Major League Baseball draft by the Tampa Bay Rays
 Jilen Siroky, swimmer who represented the United States at the 1996 Summer Olympics
 Jessica Stroup, actress and model, most notably of 90210
 Sam Talbot, semi-finalist on reality competition TV show Top Chef; executive chef
 Justin Tornow, dancer and choreographer
 Paul Waggoner, guitarist for progressive metal band Between the Buried and Me
 Impa Kasanganay, mixed martial artist

References

External links 
 
 Providence High report card

Public high schools in North Carolina
Educational institutions established in 1989
Schools in Charlotte, North Carolina
1989 establishments in North Carolina